Charlie Sprague (October 10, 1864 – December 31, 1912) was an outfielder and pitcher in Major League Baseball in 1887, 1889, and 1890. Sprague played for the Chicago White Stockings, Cleveland Spiders, and Toledo Maumees.

Sources

1864 births
1912 deaths
Baseball players from Cleveland
19th-century baseball players
Major League Baseball pitchers
Major League Baseball outfielders
Chicago White Stockings players
Cleveland Spiders players
Toledo Maumees players
Lynn Lions players
Chicago Maroons players
Toledo Black Pirates players
Denver Mountaineers players
St. Paul Apostles players
Duluth Whalebacks players
Jamestown (minor league baseball) players